A.Qadir Soud Muwaya Ductoor (1950–2014) was a social activist and translator from Uganda.

Education 
He studied in Hawza of Qom in Iran and received his PHD degree.

Activities 
Translating the book entitled "Jihad Akbar" written by Seyed Rouhollah Khomeini.
Founding 70 mosques and Islamic centers in Uganda which caused him to be named as the "Uganda's tiger of development".
Founding 3 hospitals in Uganda.

Death 
He was assassinated on September 26, 2014 in the way back from Komeil prayer ceremony on Thursday night.
His funeral was held after Friday prayer in the presence of Ugandan Prime minister, the Police chief of the region, scholars and students and other people.

References 

1950 births
2014 deaths
Ugandan translators
Ugandan activists
20th-century translators